An ornament is something used for decoration.

Ornament may also refer to:

Decoration
Ornament (art), any purely decorative element in architecture and the decorative arts
Biological ornament, a characteristic of animals that appear to serve only a decorative purpose
Bronze and brass ornamental work, decorative work that dates back to antiquity
Christmas ornament, a decoration used to festoon a Christmas tree
Dingbat, decorations in typography
Garden ornament, a decoration in a garden, landscape, or park
Hood ornament, a decoration on the hood of an automobile
Lawn ornament, a decoration in a grassy area
Ornamental plant, a decorative plant
Peak ornament, a decoration under the peak of the eaves of a gabled building

Music
Ornament (music), a flourish that serves to decorate music 
Ornament, a Russian band, forerunner to the band Kukuruza

Other uses
Ornament (football), the football team from Hong Kong
Ornaments Rubric, a prayer of the Church of England

See also
Ornamentation of the human body:
Body modification
Fashion
Human physical appearance
Jewelry
Tattoo